David Lloyd Wolper (January 11, 1928 – August 10, 2010) was an American television and film producer, responsible for shows such as Roots, The Thorn Birds, and North and South, and the theatrically-released films L.A. Confidential and Willy Wonka & the Chocolate Factory (1971). He was awarded the Jean Hersholt Humanitarian Award at the 57th Academy Awards in 1985 for his work producing the opening and closing ceremonies of the 1984 Summer Olympics in Los Angeles, as well as helping to bring the games there. His 1971 film (as executive producer) about the study of insects, The Hellstrom Chronicle, won an Academy Award.

Life and career
Wolper was born in New York City, into an eastern European Jewish family, the son of Anna (née Fass) and Irving S. Wolper. He briefly attended Drake University in Des Moines Iowa before transferring to the University of Southern California.

Wolper directed the 1959 documentary The Race for Space, which was nominated for an Academy Award, and others including Biography (1961–63), The Making of the President 1960 (1963) and Four Days in November (1964). Wolper then sold his company to Metromedia for $3.6 million in 1964. In October 1968, he paid $750,000 to leave Metromedia and took six films projects with him. The pre-1968 library is owned by Cube Entertainment (formerly International Creative Exchange), while the post-1970 library (along with Wolper's production company, Wolper Productions, now known as The Wolper Organization) has been owned by Warner Bros. since November 1976.

In 1969, Wolper received the Golden Plate Award of the American Academy of Achievement.

He won an Academy Award for the 1971 film The Hellstrom Chronicle, about the study of insects, which he executive produced. He also produced numerous documentaries and documentary series including The Rise and Fall of the Third Reich (TV) (1968), Appointment With Destiny (1971–73 TV series), Visions of Eight (1973), This Is Elvis (1981),  Imagine: John Lennon (1988) and others.

On March 13, 1974, one of his crews filming a National Geographic history of Australopithecus at Mammoth Mountain Ski Area was killed when their Sierra Pacific Airlines Corvair 440 slammed into the White Mountains shortly after takeoff from Eastern Sierra Regional Airport in Bishop, California, killing all 35 on board, including 31 Wolper crew members. The filmed segment was recovered in the wreckage and was broadcast in the television series Primal Man. The cause of the crash remains unsolved.

In 1984, he helped bring the Olympic Games to Los Angeles and produced the opening and closing ceremonies. He was awarded the Jean Hersholt Humanitarian Award at the Academy Awards the following year.

In 1988, Wolper was inducted into the Television Hall of Fame. For his work on television, he had received his star on the Hollywood Walk of Fame.

Wolper died on August 10, 2010, of congestive heart disease and complications of Parkinson's disease at his Beverly Hills home. He is buried in Forest Lawn Memorial Park's Hollywood Hills cemetery.

Productions
His company was involved in the following productions. He was a distributor of the early shows, and became an executive producer with The Race for Space in 1958.

See also
Norman Lear
Aaron Spelling
Alan Landsburg

References

External links

American documentary film directors
American television producers
1928 births
2010 deaths
 
Jean Hersholt Humanitarian Award winners
International Emmy Founders Award winners
Neurological disease deaths in California
Deaths from Parkinson's disease
Burials at Forest Lawn Memorial Park (Hollywood Hills)
 
University of Southern California alumni